Merulempista jucundella is a species of snout moth in the genus Merulempista. It was described by Pierre Chrétien in 1911 and is known from Algeria (including Biskra, the type location).

References

Moths described in 1911
Phycitini
Endemic fauna of Algeria
Moths of Africa